Mladen Solomun (born December 27, 1975), better known under his stage name Solomun, is a Bosnian-German DJ. He is a four-time DJ Awards winner for Best Producer, Best DJ and Best Melodic House DJ.

Musical career
After Solomun was born in Travnik, Yugoslavia (today Bosnia and Herzegovina), he moved to Hamburg with his family, where he grew up. As a young boy, he worked for his father in construction. Eventually, he discovered that he really enjoyed filmmaking. He founded a small production company with a few friends, where they created short films together. He worked in film for about five years before discovering that music was his passion.
His cousin, who frequented nightclubs, brought him tapes whenever he came to town. These tapes showed Solomun that there is more to music than just commercial radio. From then on, he started purchasing vinyl records, and eventually playing at House of Youth at the age of 16 for other teenagers. After taking a break from music, he started producing and creating music at the age of 23.

For about one year before he began producing on his own, he learned from a good friend that ran a hip-hop label.

In 2005, Solomun began producing music, founding the record label Diynamic in late 2005 with his partner Adriano Trolio, who manages the booking for Diynamic. The motto for Diynamic is "Do It Yourself"." Eventually, Solomun met H.O.S.H. in 2006 and that is when Diynamic kicked into full force. Solomun's first EP on Diynamic, Solomun EP, came out in 2006. Since then, he has released many other EPs and compilations, as well as the 2009 album Dance Baby. In December 2010 he launched a second label, the more experimental 2DIY4.

In 2011, Solomun remixed Noir & Haze's "Around." The track was dubbed Remix of the Year by Resident Advisor. He was named Mixmag's "DJ of the Year" in 2012, which is when his rise in popularity soared to new heights. He was also awarded Producer of the Year by the DJ Awards in Ibiza, and Best International DJ by the Cool Awards in Brazil that same year.

Solomun kicked off the Ibiza 2013 season by presiding over the Burn Studios Residency bootcamp.

Until the end of June 2014, he owned the Hamburg-based club Ego, co-run by his sister and Adriano Trolio. 

Solomun's musical roots are in hip-hop, soul, funk, and R&B. His sound has been described as "house music, but with deep, ultra funky basslines, euphoric melodies and emotionally charged vocals".

In 2015, he was holding two residencies on Ibiza, at night-clubs Pacha and Destino.

Solomun kicked off 2016 with two events at The BPM Festival including Diynamic in the Jungle and Solomun +1 with Mano Le Tough. Following that, the Bosnian artist continued touring across North America. The Diynamic family then celebrated ten years at Watergate in Berlin on April 9, 2016, which they followed with a ten-year celebration at DC-10 in Ibiza on August 19, 2016.

Solomun also hosted two residencies in Ibiza, Spain, in 2016—Solomun +1 at Pacha and Solomun +1 live at Ushuaia and Destino. He has played at events like Ultra Europe, Exit Festival, Melt! Festival, Tomorrowland, and Movement Croatia in 2016 and 2017, also in Hungexpo in 2018.

In 2018, Solomun played himself as an in-residence DJ for the videogame Grand Theft Auto Online, as part of the After Hours DLC. Additionally, Solomun's music video for "Customer is King"  was made entirely within Grand Theft Auto V's in-game engine as part of a larger collaboration between him and Rockstar Games.

Industry awards

2019
 Winner - Best International DJ – Cool Awards Brazil (BR)

2018
 Winner - Category: Melodic House and Techno - DJ Awards Ibiza (ES)
 Best DJ: #3 // FAZE Mag (DE/AT/CH)

2017
 Best DJ: #1 // FAZE Mag (DE/AT/CH)
 Best Remix: Age Of Love – The Age Of Love (Solomun Renaissance Remix) // FAZE Mag (DE/AT/CH)

2016
 Best DJ: #1 (Deep House, public vote) // Beatport
 Best DJ: #5 // Resident Advisor 
 Best DJ: #1 // DJ Mag Italia (IT) 
 Best Night: “Solomun+1″ (Sundays at Pacha) // DJ Mag Italia (IT) 
 Best Remixes // DJ Mag Italia (IT):
- Whilk & Misky - Clap Your Hands (Solomun Remix) 
- Ost & Kjex - Queen of Europe (Solomun Remix)
 Ibizas most shazaamt summer hits: 
- #2 Whilk & Misky - Clap Your Hands (Solomun Remix)

2015
 Winner - Category: Deep House - DJ Awards Ibiza (ES)
 Winner - Best DJ: Solomun - DJ Mag Italia (IT)
 Winner - Best Night: “Solomun +1″ (Sundays at Pacha) - DJ Mag Italia (IT)
 Best DJ #13 - Resident Advisor (UK)

2014 
 Best DJ No. 26 - Resident Advisor (UK)

2013
 Winner - Category: Deep House - DJ Awards Ibiza (ES)
 Best DJ #24 - Resident Advisor (UK)

2012
 Winner - DJ of the Year – Mixmag Magazine (UK)
 Winner - Best Producer – DJ Awards Ibiza (ES)
 Winner - Best International DJ – Cool Awards Brazil (BR)
 Best International Tour – Rio Music Conference Award (BR)
 Best Producer – Groove Magazine (DE, AT, CH)
 Best Label Diynamic – Groove Magazine (DE, AT, CH)
 Best DJ No. 03 – Groove Magazine (DE, AT, CH)
 Best Track No. 04 Kackvogel – Groove Magazine (DE, AT, CH)
 Best Producer No. 6 – Faze Mag (DE, AT, CH)
 Best Label Diynamic No. 5 Faze Mag (DE, AT, CH)
 Best Track No. 14 Kackvogel – Faze Mag (DE,AT,CH)
 Best DJ No. 22 – Resident Advisor (UK)
 Best Compilation No. 05 (Watergate 11) – DJ Mag (UK)
 Best Compilation No. 05 (Watergate 11) – Mixmag Magazine (UK)

2011
 Remix of the Year- Around (Noir & Haze) - Resident Advisor (UK)
 Most Charted Artist" No. 04 Resident Advisor (UK)
 Best Remix No. 02 – Around (Noir & Haze) - Groove Magazine (DE, AT, CH)
 Best Remix No. 03 - Let's Go Back (Kraak & Smaak ) - Groove Magazine (DE, AT, CH)
 Best Producer No. 02 - Groove Magazine (DE, AT, CH)
 Best DJ No. 03 - Groove Magazine (DE, AT, CH)
 Best DJ No. 05 - De:Bug Magazine (DE, AT, CH)

Discography

Releases
 2005 Galaxy Empire – Mudra Records
 2005 Jackpot – Schanzen Rec. – CD Compilation
 2005 Frei – Schanzen Rec. – CD Compilation
 2006 Do It Yourself EP – Diynamic Music
 2006 Nachrichten EP – Diynamic Music
 2006 Oelkersallee EP – Diynamic Music
 2006 Solomun EP – Diynamic Music
 2007 Feuer und Eis EP – Diynamic Music
 2007 Hooked / Jungle River Cruise – liebe*detail
 2007 Koboldmaki – Sonar Kollektiv
 2007 Meerkats – Sonar Kollektiv
 2007 Mischwaren EP – Diynamic Music
 2007 Sambada EP – Dessous Recordings
 2007 Second Kiss in Winter / Four Seasons EP – Diynamic Music
 2008 Deadman/Beauty and the Beast – Four:Twenty
 2008 Ghostdog / Trilogy EP – Diynamic Music
 2008 Flying Pics EP – Diynamic Music
 2008 Beauty and the Beast / Dead Man – Four:Twenty
 2008 Black Rose / Trickski Remix – Sonar Kollektiv
 2008 Woodstep EP – Dessous
 2008 International Hustle EP – Four:Twenty
 2008 Argy and Solomun – Focus On – Poker Flat
 2008 Midnight Call EP – Compost black
 2008 Federgewicht EP – Diynamic Music
 2009 Carnivale / Factory – Phil e
 2009 Dance Baby – Diynamic Music
 2010 Sisi EP - Leena Music
 2011 Daddy's Jam – Rebellion
 2011 Love Recycled EP – 2DIY4
 2011 Zappzerapp EP – Diynamic Music
 2011 Challenge Everyday EP – Diynamic Music
 2011 Something We All Adore EP – Supernature
 2012 Living On – from: 5 years Diynamic Charity Compilation – Diynamic Music
 2012 Kackvogel – Watergate Records
 2013 Bootcamp - Diynamic Music
 2014 Samson - Diynamic Music
 2014 Friends – 2DIY4
 2015 "Zora" - Diynamic Music
 2016 Let it out – Solomun feat. Liu Bei – Diynamic Music 
 2016 Solomun Selected Remixes 2009-2015 – Diynamic Music
 2018 Customer Is King EP – Diynamic Music
 2020 Home – Diynamic Music

Remixes
 2007 Bearweasel – "Monkier" (Solomun Remix) – Supernature
 2007 Barbo – "Barbi in Love" (Solomun Remix) – Buzzin Fly
 2007 Monoroom – "Feed Me" (Solomun Remix) – Freunde Tontraeger
 2008 Tiger Stripes – "Hooked" (Solomun Remix) – Liebe*detail
 2008 Kollektiv Turmstrasse – "Blutsbrueder" (Solomun Rmx) – MGF
 2008 Palm Skin Productions – "Wonderful Thing" (Solomun Remix ) – Freerange
 2008 Marbert Rocel – "Cornflakes" (Solomun Remix ) – Compost Black
 2008 Christian Prommer – Daft Punk/"Around the World" – (Solomun Remix)
 2010 Oliver Koletzki And Fran – "Echoes" (Solomun Remix) – Stil Vor Talent
 2011 Gorge – "Garuna" (Solomun Remix) – 8bit
 2011 Edu Imbernon and Los Suruba – "Punset" (Solomun Remix) – Eklektisch
 2011 DJ Hell – "Germania" (Solomun Remix) – Gigolo Records
 2011 Noir and Haze – "Around" (Solomun Remix) – Noir Music
 2011 Kraak and Smaak – "Let's Go Back" (feat. Romanthony) (Solomun Remix)
 2011 Tiefschwarz – "Corporate Butcher" (Solomun Remix) – Watergate Records
 2012 Pool – "Game Over" (Solomun Remix) – 2DIY4
 2012 Luca C & Brigante feat. Roisin Murphy – "Flash of Light" (Solomun Remix) – Southern Fried Records
 2013 Foals – "Late Night" (Solomun Remix)
 2013 Tiga vs. Audion – "Let's Go Dancing" (Solomun Remix) – Turbo Recordings
 2014 Claude VonStroke – "The Clapping Track" (Solomun Remix) – Dirtybird
 2014 Broken Bells – "Holding on For Life" (Solomun Remix) – Sony Music
 2014 Lana del Rey - West Coast (Solomun Remix)- Polydor Ltd.
 2015 Liu Bei - Atlas World (Solomun Day / Night Remixes) - 2DIY4
 2015 Josef Salvat – Hustler (Solomun Remix) – Columbia 
 2015 Paul Kalkbrenner – Cloud Rider (Solomun Remix) – Sony Music 
 2015 Editors – Our Love (Solomun Remix) – Pias 
 2015 Johannes Brecht – Breathe! (Solomun Edit) – Diynamic Music 
 2015 Whilk & Misky – Clap Your Hands (Solomun Remix) – Island/Universal
 2016 Interpol – Everything is wrong (Solomun Remix)- Matador 
 2016 Ost&Kjex feat. Anne Lise Frokedal – Queen of Europe (Solomun Remix) – Diynamic Music 
 2016 Stimming – Alpe Lusia (Solomun Remix) – Diynamic Music 
 2016 Moderat – Eating Hooks (Siriusmo Remix, Solomun Edit) – Monkeytown 
 2016 Michael Mayer & Joe Goddard – For you Solomun Morning Version – K7! 
 2016 Michael Mayer & Joe Goddard – For you Solomun Night Version – K7!
 2017 Age of Love - The Age of Love (Solomun Renaissance Remix) - Renaissance Records
 2017 DJ Hell - Anything, Anytime (Solomun Remix) _ International Deejay Gigolo Records
 2017 Depeche Mode - Going Backwards (Solomun Remix) - Columbia (Sony)
 2017 Super Flu - mygut (Solomun Remix) - Monaberry
 2017 Leonard Cohen - You Want It Darker (Solomun Remix) - Sony Music Entertainment
 2017 Pantha du Prince - Dream Yourself Awake (Solomun Remix) - Plangent Records
 2018 Made by Pete feat. Jem Cooke - So long (Solomun Remix) - Crosstown Rebels
 2018 Eagles & Butterflies - The Last Dance (Solomun Remix) - Art Imitating Life
 2018 Stephan Bodzin & Marc Romboy - Kerberos (Solomun & Johannes Brecht Remix) - Systematic
 2018 Keinemusik - You Are Safe (Solomun Remix) - Keinemusik
 2019 Apparat - Outlier (Solomun Remix) - Mute
 2019 Agoria - You're Not Alone (Solomun Remix) - Sapiens
 2019 Âme - The Line (Solomun Remixes: Frank's Vote and Kristian's Vote) - Innervisions
 2019 Jon Hopkins - Emerald Rush (Solomun Remix) - Domino
 2019 Adriatique - Nude (Solomun Remix) - Afterlife

Music
 2016 Stimming – Alpe Lusia (Solomun Remix) – Diynamic Music
 2016 Moderat – Eating Hooks (Siriusmo Remix, Solomun Edit) – Monkeytown
 2016 Michael Mayer & Joe Goddard – For you Solomun Morning Version – K7!
 2016 Michael Mayer & Joe Goddard – For you Solomun Night Version – K7!

See also
 Similar artists from former Yugoslavia: UMEK (SLO) Mike Vale (SLO), Ilija Djokovic (SRB), Rub A Dub (BiH), Flojd Covic (BiH), Zlatinchi (BiH), Sinisa Tamamovic (BiH), Mladen Tomic (BiH), Forniva (BiH), Andrew Meller (SRB).

References

1975 births
Living people
German DJs
German house musicians
People from Travnik
Electronic dance music DJs